This is a list of University of Ottawa people.

Notable people

Athletes and leaders in sports 
Caleb Agada (born 1994), Nigerian-Canadian basketball player in the Israeli Premier League and for the Nigerian national basketball team
James Cartwright, Olympic athlete (kayak)
Michael A. Chambers, former president of the Canadian Olympic Committee and Olympic Order recipient
Sonia Denoncourt, association football referee
Doug Falconer, CFL football player, film producer
Lou Lefaive, Canadian sports administrator and civil servant
Neil Lumsden, CFL football player
Sherraine MacKay, Olympic athlete (épée fencing)
Silver Quilty, Canadian Football Hall of Fame inductee
Brad Sinopoli, CFL football player
 Charles Thiffault (born 1939), NHL ice hockey coach
Ibrahim Tounkara, CFL football player
Ousmane Tounkara, CFL football player

Business leaders 
France Chrétien, prominent lawyer and businesswoman; daughter of former Prime Minister Jean Chrétien
Andre Desmarais, President and CEO of Power Corp. Canada
Paul Desmarais, entrepreneur
Daniel Lamarre, president and chief operating officer of Cirque du Soleil
Chuck Rifici, Canadian entrepreneur, former CEO of Tweed Marijuana Inc, and former CFO of the Liberal Party of Canada.
Sherrexcia Rolle, Bahamian attorney and VP of Operations & General Counsel of Western Air

Civil servants and public sector leaders 
 Johanne Bélisle, former Commissioner of Patents, Registrar of Trademarks and Chief Executive Officer of the Canadian Intellectual Property Office (CIPO)
Jocelyne Bourgon, Canadian representative to the Organisation for Economic Co-operation and Development (OECD); former Clerk of the Privy Council
William J. S. Elliott, former commissioner of the Royal Canadian Mounted Police
Robert John Giroux, university president
Ahmed Hussen, Federal Cabinet Minister and President of the Canadian Somali Congress
Christiane Ouimet, first Public Sector Integrity Commissioner of Canada
Sheridan Scott, Commissioner of Competition of the Competition Bureau
Paul Tellier, former Clerk of the Privy Council

Journalists 
Samantha Bee, host of Full Frontal with Samantha Bee
Marcel Desjardins, political commentator and news director
Pierre Dufault, journalist and sports commentator for Radio-Canada
Mary Lou Finlay, journalist for the CBC
Peter Jennings, journalist and news anchor for ABC News
Lisa LaFlamme, journalist
Alex Trebek, former broadcaster for CBC, host of the game show Jeopardy!

Jurists 
Louise Arbour, UN High Commissioner for Human Rights; former Supreme Court Justice
Michel Bastarache, Justice of the Supreme Court of Canada
Louise Charron, Justice of the Supreme Court of Canada
Gérald Fauteux, former Chief Justice of the Supreme Court
Louis LeBel, Justice of the Supreme Court
Richard Wagner, Chief Justice of Canada

Musicians 
Joyce El-Khoury, opera singer
Angela Hewitt, pianist
Roch Voisine, singer-songwriter
Grizz LeSaint, singer-songwriter/rapper

Media personalities 
George Aryee, Director General of the Ghana Broadcasting Corporation (1991–1992)
Randall Dark, director, producer, and HDTV pioneer
Erica Ehm, television personality and songwriter, former MuchMusic VJ
Jeanette Jenkins, Hollywood fitness trainer, spokeswoman for BET's Television foundation, "A Healthy BET Campaign"
Suzanne Pinel, children's entertainer (Marie-Soleil)
Quddus, model, MTV VJ

Natural scientists and engineers 
Xiaoyi Bao, professor, Canada Research Chair in Fiber Optics and Photonics
Robert W. Boyd, physicist, Canada Excellence Research Chair Laureate in Quantum Nonlinear Optics
Timothy C. Lethbridge, professor of computer science and software engineering
Tuncer Őren, professor emeritus of computer science 
Tito Scaiano, professor of chemistry, photochemist
Dafydd Williams, astronaut

Physicians and other health care professionals 
Mark Aubry, Chief Medical Officer of Hockey Canada, and the International Ice Hockey Federation
Anna Baranowsky, clinical psychologist; founder and CEO of the Traumatology Institute
Margaret Beznak, physiologist
Walter Douglas Boyd, cardiothoracic surgeon and innovator, developed minimally invasive robotic cardiac surgery and cardiac regeneration procedures
Dave Holmes, University Research Chair in Forensic Nursing; Editor-in-Chief of Aporia - the Nursing Journal
Wilbert Joseph Keon, cardiovascular surgeon, first Canadian to implant an artificial heart in a human
Padmaja Subbarao, respirologist and scientist in physiology and experimental medicine
Philip Steven Wells, hematologist, developed the Wells risk score for pulmonary embolism and deep vein thrombosis

Political leaders 
Philémon Yunji Yang , Former Cameroon Prime minister

Federal and international 
Abdiweli Sheikh Ahmed, former Prime Minister of Somalia
Bernard Chidzero, former Finance Minister of Zimbabwe
Ousainou Darboe, former Vice-President of the Gambia
Salter Hayden, Senator and lawyer
Rahim Jaffer, former Canadian Member of Parliament
John Manley, former Canadian Deputy Prime Minister and Minister of Finance
Paul Martin, former Prime Minister of Canada
Gabriela Michetti, former Vice President of Argentina
Sir Edward Morris, former Prime Minister of Newfoundland
André Ouellet, former Minister and CEO and president of Canada Post
Jean-Luc Pepin, politician, Cabinet minister
John Richardson, Brigadier General in the Canadian Forces and Member of Parliament
Allan Rock, former Minister of Justice, among other ministerial portfolios, Canadian Ambassador to the United Nations, President of the University of Ottawa
Hugh Segal, politician and Senator

Provincial & Territorial 
Howard Hampton, former leader of the Ontario New Democratic Party
Dalton McGuinty, former Premier of Ontario
Paul Okalik, first premier of Nunavut
Bernard Drainville, MNA for Lévis

Municipal 
Bob Chiarelli, former mayor of the City of Ottawa
Mathieu Fleury, current Ottawa City Councillor for Rideau-Vanier
Jean-Paul L'Allier, former mayor of Quebec City
Gérald Tremblay, former mayor of Montreal

Social scientists 
Merridee Bujaki, manager of Accounting Studies
Michel Chossudovsky, economist and author
Dimitri Kitsikis, geopolitician
Anna Koutsoyiannis, economist
Joel Westheimer, American-born professor at the University of Ottawa

Visual artists 
Jean-Marc Carisse, photographer, author and recipient of Library and Archives Canada Scholar Award
Philippe Falardeau, Oscar-nominated director

Writers and literature experts 
Angèle Bassolé-Ouédraogo, Ivoirian poet
Michel Bock, professor of history, Governor General's literary award winner
Michel Marc Bouchard, playwright
Cyril Dabydeen, author and Professor of English
Andrew Donskov, professor of modern languages, Tolstoy expert
Faisal Kutty, lawyer, writer, human rights activist, academic teaching at Osgoode Hall Law School and at Valparaiso University
Angela Narth, children's author
Carol Shields, Pulitzer Prize–winning writer
Kim Renders (BA in drama 1977), playwright, theatre director and actor; co-founder of Nightwood Theatre
Christl Verduyn, professor of English Literature and Canadian Studies; recipient of the Governor General's International Award for Canadian Studies (2006)

Other 
Cihan Erdal, PhD student of Anthropology detained in Turkey by the government
Abdul Rahman Jabarah, alleged al-Qaeda member killed in 2003
Ahmed Khadr, alleged by Canada and the United States of being a "senior associate" and financier of al-Qaeda killed in Afghanistan in 2003 
Denis Rancourt, former physics professor, scientist, academic dissident

Chancellors and presidents

List of chancellors
(1889–1965)
University of Ottawa

 1889–1909    Mgr Joseph-Thomas Duhamel
 1911–1922    Mgr Charles-Hugues Gauthier
 1922–1927    Mgr Joseph-Médard Émard
 1928–1940    Mgr Joseph-Guillaume-Laurent Forbes
 1940–1953    Mgr Alexandre Vachon
 1953–1965    Mgr Marie-Joseph Lemieux, OP

(1965–present)
University of Ottawa (reorganised)

 1966–1973 Pauline Vanier
 1973–1979 The Right Honourable Gérald Fauteux
 1979–1985 Gabrielle Léger
 1985–1990 The Honourable Maurice Sauvé
 1991–1993 Gordon F. Henderson
 1994–2012 Huguette Labelle
 2012-2015 Michaelle Jean
 2015–present Calin Rovinescu

List of presidents
(1848–1861)
Le Collège de Bytown / The College of Bytown

1848-1849 Édouard Chevalier, OMI
1849-1850 Jean-François Allard, OMI
1850-1851 Napoléon Mignault, OMI
1851-1853 Augustin Gaudet, OMI
1853-1861 Joseph-Henri Tabaret, OMI

(1861–1889)
Collège d'Ottawa / College of Ottawa

1861-1864 Joseph-Henri Tabaret, OMI
1864-1867 Timothy Ryan, OMI
1867-1874 Joseph-Henri Tabaret, OMI
1874-1877 Antoine Paillier, OMI
1877-1886 Joseph-Henri Tabaret, OMI
1886      Philémon Provost, OMI
1886-1887 Antoine Paillier, OMI
1887-1889 Jean-Marie Fayard, OMI

(1889–1965)
Université d'Ottawa / University of Ottawa

1889-1898 James McGuckin, OMI
1898-1901 Henri-Antoine Constantineau, OMI
1901-1905 Joseph-Édouard Émery, OMI
1905-1911 William Murphy, OMI
1911-1914 Adrien-Bruno Roy, OMI
1914-1915 Henri Gervais, OMI
1915-1921 Louis Rhéaume, OMI
1921-1927 François-Xavier Marcotte, OMI
1927-1930 Uldéric Robert, OMI
1930-1936 Gilles Marchand, OMI
1936-1942 Joseph Hébert, OMI
1942-1946 Philippe Cornellier, OMI
1946-1952 Jean-Charles LaFramboise, OMI
1952-1958 Rodrigue Normandin, OMI
1958-1964 Henri-F. Légaré, OMI
1964-1965 Roger Guindon, OMI

(1965–present)
Université d'Ottawa (nouvelle structure) / University of Ottawa (reorganised)

1965-1984 Roger Guindon, OMI
1984-1990 Antoine D'Iorio
1990-2001 Marcel Hamelin
2001-2008 Gilles G. Patry
2008-2017 Allan Rock
2017–present Jacques Frémont

References

 
 
University of Ottawa alumni
Ottawa
University people